Maksudan is a village at the bank of holy river Gomti near to Dhopap in Lambhua Mandal, Sultanpur district, Uttar Pradesh.

History 
At the Ancient period Lord Rama had spent some time in this holy village at the Bank of Uttarwahini Gomti. due to that people called it Madhusudan's Village and later on people called it Maksudan.

Geography 
Total population  of the village is approx 10000 with 5500 male and 4500 female.
Maksudan is located 5 km distance from its Mandal Main Town Lambhua. It is 25 km from its district main city Sultanpur and 155 km from the capital Lucknow. Nearby villages of this village with distance are Narendrapur (0.6 km), Rampur (2 km), Shobhipur (2.2 km), Mampur (1.8 km), Dhopap (2.9 km). Nearest Towns are Bhadiyan (9.4 km), Lambhua (5 km), Chanda (15 km), Dhopap (3 km).

Zafrapur, Jiyanpur, Mishrapur, Ralhi ka Pura, Kharahna are the villages along with this village in the same Lambhua Mandal.

References 

Villages in Sultanpur district